Marilyn Diamond is an American author and speaker on the topic of anti-aging and longevity. She is known for advocating a "cleansing" or "detoxification" diet.

Career
In 1985, with her then husband Harvey Diamond, she co-authored the best-selling health and wellness book Fit for Life.  The book built on the natural health movement that had roots in 19th century, and was part of the development of the fascination with celebrity beauty in contemporary American culture.

Diamond's ideas about diet and aging have been the subject of controversy in the media. In particular, nutritionists disagree with her assertion that some foods should not be eaten together.

Publications

Books

References 

Alternative detoxification promoters
American non-fiction writers
Year of birth missing (living people)
Living people
Pseudoscientific diet advocates